Alexandre Dimitri Shibicky (May 19, 1914 – July 9, 2005) was a Canadian ice hockey forward who played for the New York Rangers of the National Hockey League from 1935 to 1946.

Shibicky was also a Stanley Cup winner in 1940, and the vice-president of the first incarnation of the National Hockey League Players Association, but he is best known for being the first player to use a slapshot, which he did in 1937. He said he learned it in practice from teammate Fred "Bun" Cook during the 1935–36 season. He also spent three years in the Canadian Forces during the Second World War.

Career statistics

Regular season and playoffs

Awards and achievements
 EAHL First All-Star Team (1935)
 Stanley Cup Championship (1940)
 Honoured Member of the Manitoba Hockey Hall of Fame
 In the 2009 book 100 Ranger Greats, was ranked No. 57 all-time of the 901 New York Rangers who had played during the team's first 82 seasons

References

External links

1914 births
2005 deaths
Canadian military personnel from Manitoba
Canadian military personnel
Canadian ice hockey forwards
Canadian military personnel of World War II
New Haven Ramblers players
New York Crescents players
New York Rangers players
New Westminster Royals (WHL) players
Ottawa Senators (QSHL) players
Philadelphia Ramblers players
Providence Reds players
Selkirk Jr. Fishermen players
Ice hockey people from Winnipeg
Stanley Cup champions
Winnipeg Columbus Club players